Silvia Lemus de Fuentes is a journalist and host of the interview television programme Tratos y Retratos. She is the widow of Mexican novelist Carlos Fuentes. Galician in origin, Silvia was the wife and hostess for her husband, when he was Mexico's Ambassador to France.

In 1972, she married Fuentes, and they travelled to France and the United States, she as a journalist and he as a scholar. The United States Central Intelligence Agency kept a file on Lemus de Fuentes and her husband because of their "Mzrxist" (sic.) associations.

Together, Carlos and Silvia had two children, Carlos and Natasha, deceased aged 25 and 30. Silvia and her husband then founded the "Carlos y Natasha Fuentes Lemus Foundation". They lived in London, but spent part of the year traveling between New York, Mexico and Europe.

Lemus de Fuentes gained recognition when she started Tratos y Retratos; Beyond the fame, there is a human being, an internationally acclaimed television show in which she interviewed her friends and other famous artists and intellectuals. Amongst the interviewees are Anthony Quinn, Carlos Montemayor, Henry Kissinger, José Saramago, Salman Rushdie, Eric Hobsbawm, Fernando Botero, Susan Sontag, Toni Morrison, Steven Spielberg, Antonio Banderas, Isabel Allende and Mia Farrow, as well as her husband's long-time friend Gabriel Garcia Marquez. There are 52 programs in all, traveling through the diversity of peoples, geographies, scenarios, periods, times and cultures.

Silvia is commonly seen in tabloid publications in the company of celebrated figures, such as King Juan Carlos of Spain and Hillary Clinton. More recently she was seen at the wedding of King Felipe VI of Spain.

On May 15, 2012, Carlos Fuentes died in Angeles del Pedregal hospital in southern Mexico City from a massive haemorrhage. He received a state funeral the following day.

References

Year of birth missing (living people)
Living people
Mexican women ambassadors
Mexican television journalists
Mexican people of Galician descent
Ambassadors of Mexico to France
Ambassadors of Mexico to the United States